Kuessi Alikem Segbefia (born April 1, 1990) is a Togolese footballer, who plays for Teshrin.

Career
Segbefia began his career with Sporting Club Lome on youth side and was transferred to AS Douanes (Lomé). In October 2009 left Gomido to sign for Al-Jaish Damascus, who was later loaned out to Teshrin.

International career
Segbefia presented the Togo U-17 at 2007 FIFA U-17 World Cup, he played by the Championship three games. He played his first international game for Les Eperviers on 10 September 2008 against Zambia national football team.

Personal life
His brother Prince Segbefia, played with him at 2007 FIFA U-17 World Cup.

References

External links

1990 births
Living people
Sportspeople from Lomé
Togolese footballers
Togo international footballers
Togolese expatriate footballers
Expatriate footballers in Syria
Gomido FC players
AS Douanes (Togo) players
Association football midfielders
Syrian Premier League players
21st-century Togolese people